The New Cross to Finsbury Market Cable Tunnel is a  long,  diameter tunnel beneath London which carries power distribution cables for UK Power Networks as part of the London power distribution network. It was built between 2009 and 2017 by J. Murphy & Sons.

Along the route, it connects substations at Osborn Street in Whitechapel and Wellclose Square in Wapping, passing beneath the River Thames downstream of Tower Bridge.

The tunnel carries cables operating at a voltage of 132 kV with a capacity of 400 MW - enough to power 130,000 homes.

References

See also 
 Elstree to St. John's Wood Cable Tunnel
 Lower Lea Valley Cable Tunnels
 London Power Tunnels

Tunnels in London
Electric power infrastructure in England
Electric power transmission in the United Kingdom
Tunnels underneath the River Thames
Buildings and structures in the London Borough of Lewisham
Buildings and structures in the London Borough of Hackney